Kheyrabad (also Romanized as Kheyrābād) is a village in Eqbal-e Gharbi Rural District, in the Central District of Qazvin County, Qazvin Province, Iran. At the 2006 census, its population was 1,126, in 287 families.

References 

Populated places in Qazvin County